Tony Anthony (born 1960) is an American wrestler.

Tony Anthony may also refer to:

 Tony Anthony (actor) (born 1937), American actor and director
 Tony Anthony (evangelist) (born 1971), British evangelist

See also
Anthony Anthony